St. Helens Court is a five-story student residence hall at Portland State University in Portland, Oregon, a city in the United States. The building contains 36 studios and 15 one-bedroom units.

History

St. Helens Court was constructed in 1927 by real estate developer Harry Mittleman as a luxury apartment building. The steel reinforced concrete design was faced with red veneer brick and Mediterranean Revival decorations suggesting Spanish influence. The 50 apartments, each with two or three rooms, were furnished with "warm, well-appointed" Spanish-style items and a radio, electric refrigeration, and electric ranges. 

The owner considered his wife, Helen, to be a saint. For that reason, the building was named Saint Helen's Court and later St. Helens Court.

Portland State University acquired the property in 1969.

References

External links
 
University Housing 101
Your guide to St. Helens Court

1927 establishments in Oregon
Apartment buildings in Portland, Oregon
Buildings and structures completed in 1927
Portland State University buildings
University and college dormitories in the United States